Jean Louail (1668–1724) was a French theologian.

1668 births
1724 deaths
18th-century French Catholic theologians